SP Manweb is the regional electricity distribution network operator (DNO) for Merseyside, North Wales and parts of Cheshire. It is now part of SP Energy Networks, itself a subsidiary of the Spanish energy company Iberdrola.

Nationalised industry 
The company was originally created in 1947 as the nationalised Merseyside and North Wales Electricity Board in the Electricity Act 1947. It was privatised in 1990, when it became become MANWEB plc. MANWEB was responsible for the purchase of electricity from the electricity generator (the Central Electricity Generating Board from 1958) and the distribution and sale of electricity to customers.

The total number of customers supplied by the board was:

The amount of electricity, in GWh, sold by MANWEB over its operational life was as follows:

Post privatisation 
The company was purchased by Scottish Power in 1996 and subsequently become SP Manweb plc. The name Manweb continued to be used alongside the Scottish Power logo on home and retail publications until 2007, when it was replaced by ScottishPower. However, the Merseyside, Cheshire and North Wales electricity distributor continues as SP Manweb plc, which is managed, along with the Scottish network operators SP Distribution plc and SP Transmission plc, as SP Energy Networks. A fourth company, SP Power Systems Ltd, maintains the distribution networks for each of these companies.

See also
 Electricity sector in the United Kingdom

References

External links

ScottishPower homepage

Companies based in Chester
Former nationalised industries of the United Kingdom
Electric power companies of the United Kingdom
Utilities of England
1947 establishments in England